James Burns (20 June 1866 – 11 September 1957) was an English cricketer. He played for Essex between 1890 and 1901.

References

External links

1866 births
1957 deaths
English cricketers
Essex cricketers
Cricketers from Liverpool
Marylebone Cricket Club cricketers
North v South cricketers